Ferenc Szőnyi (born 25 August 1964, in Komárom) is a Hungarian ultra-triathlete and ultra-runner.

At the age of 40, he took up the triathlon and soon realized that he could excel as runner and triathlete in longer distances. He finished at 4th place in his first double Ironman race, in Bonyhád, Hungary, in 2008, after which he participated in several extreme distance events, like the Vienna–Bratislava–Budapest Supermarathon in his home country and in the Deca-Ironman, which consists of 38 kilometers of swimming, 1800 kilometers of cycling and 422 kilometers of running, and even the Double Deca-Ironman, both held in Monterrey, Mexico. In 2018, he won the Decaman ultratriathlon in New Orleans and by the president of Hungary he was bestowed Knight of the Order of Merit of the Hungarian Republic (Civilian).

Main achievements 

 

In Mexico in 2009 Szőnyi set the new world record for the 10xIronman race with 115hrs time.
During this race the participants completed one full distance Ironman triathlon every day for 10 consecutive days. All together these ironmen completed 38 km swim, 1800 km bike ride and 422 km run.

Szőnyi also achieved two cycling records:
Within 24 hours he completed 721 km. Also, he completed 1000 km in 34 hrs.
2000-ben broke the old record 

Szőnyi completed twice one of the longest and hardest land race called Spartathlon (245.3 km) and one of the longest bicycle race called Race Across America (4800 km).

In his civil life he works in the construction business. He is a father of 4.

References

1964 births
Living people
Hungarian male triathletes